() is a maxim in the Anglo-Norman language, a dialect of Old Norman French spoken by the medieval ruling class in England, meaning "shamed be whoever thinks ill of it", usually translated as "shame on anyone who thinks evil of it". It is the motto of the British chivalric Order of the Garter, the highest of all British knighthoods, except in Scotland.

In current French usage, the phrase may be used ironically to imply the presence of a hidden agenda or a conflict of interest.

Origin
King Edward III founded the Order of the Garter around the time of his claim to the French throne. The traditional year of foundation is usually given as 1348 (when it was formally proclaimed).

According to Polydore Virgil's Anglica Historia, written in 1512–1513, 166 years after the event, the origin was a trivial mishap at a court function.  King Edward III was dancing with Joan of Kent, his first cousin and daughter-in-law, at a ball held in Calais to celebrate the fall of the city after the Battle of Crécy. Her garter slipped down to her ankle, causing those around her to laugh at her humiliation. Edward placed the garter around his own leg, saying: "" ("Shame on anyone who thinks evil of it. Whoever is laughing at this [thing] today will later be proud to wear it."). Scholars typically consider this version to be apocryphal, as there are no contemporary sources for it, and as garters were not worn by women at that time.

According to David Nash Ford:

Sir Gawain and the Green Knight
The poem is connected to the Order of the Garter.
In the poem, a girdle, very similar in its erotic undertones to the garter, plays a prominent role. A rough equivalent of the Order's motto 
has been identified in Gawain's exclamation  ("cursed be both cowardice and coveting", v. 2374). 
While the author of the poem remains disputed, there seems to be a connection between two of the top candidates and the Order of the Garter, John of Gaunt, and Enguerrand de Coucy, seventh Sire de Coucy. De Coucy was married to King Edward III's daughter, Isabella, and was admitted to the Order of the Garter on their wedding day.

Heraldic use

In English heraldry, the motto  is used either as a stand-alone motto upon a motto scroll, or upon a circular representation of the Garter. Knights and Ladies of the Garter are entitled to encircle the escutcheon of their arms with the garter and motto (e.g. The 1st Duke of Marlborough).

The latter usage can also be seen in the royal coat of arms of the United Kingdom, with the motto of the royal arms, being displayed on a scroll beneath the shield. As part of the royal arms, the motto is displayed in many public buildings in Britain and colonial era public buildings in various parts of the Commonwealth (such as all Courts of England and Wales). The royal arms (and motto) appear on many British government official documents (e.g. the front of current British passports); on packaging and stationery of companies operating under Royal Warrant (e.g. the banner of The Times, which uses the royal coat of arms of Great Britain circa 1714 to 1800); and are used by other entities so distinguished by the British monarch (e.g. as the official emblem of the Royal Yacht Britannia).

Several military organisations in the Commonwealth incorporate the motto inscribed upon a garter of the order within their badges (or cyphers) and some use  as their motto. Corps and regiments using the motto in this fashion are ('*' indicates usage as a motto in addition to inclusion in the badge):
 Also used on items, e.g., the baton, of the Society of High Constables of Edinburgh (founded 1611), along with the phrase ' nisi dominus frustra'.
 British Army: the Royal Horse Artillery; Household Cavalry Regiment; Life Guards (motto appears in the Garter Star representation worn on Life Guard officer's helmets rather than in the unit badge); Blues and Royals; Royal Engineers; Grenadier Guards*; Coldstream Guards; Princess of Wales's Royal Regiment; Royal Regiment of Fusiliers; and the Royal Logistic Corps (which in April 1993 became an amalgamation of the trades of five corps, which included the Royal Corps of Transport the Royal Army Ordnance Corps, The Royal Pioneer Corps, the Army Catering Corps and the Postal and Courier Services of the Royal Engineers, all of these forming Corps used the motto inscribed garter in their badge).
 Australian Army: the Royal Australian Engineers* (motto is one of two used); Royal Australian Army Service Corps (merged in 1973 into the newly raised RACT (and who did not use the motto), and the Royal Australian Army Ordnance Corps); 
 Canadian Army: The Governor General's Horse Guards, The Royal Regiment of Canada, The Royal Montreal Regiment* and The Royal Canadian Horse Artillery. 
 New Zealand Army: the 6th Hauraki Infantry Regiment.

Other uses

 It appears on in the lower half of the coverpage for the Coverdale Bible where it surrounds the coat of arms of Henry VIII. 
 It appears in The King's School, Grantham coat of arms.
 It appears on several British military cap badges. Bounty mutineer James Morrison had the motto with a garter tattooed around his left leg, according to William Bligh's Notebook.
 It is a motto for many schools and educational institutions; the title of the University of Sydney student newspaper, Honi Soit, is derived from the motto.
 It appears in a number of literary works, including Robert Anton Wilson's Masks of the Illuminati, Robert A. Heinlein's Friday, Bernard Malamud's The Natural, Shakespeare's The Merry Wives of Windsor (Act V, Scene V), Thomas De Quincey's Confessions of an English Opium-Eater (Introduction to "The Pains of Opium"), Leo Tolstoy's Anna Karenina (Part 1, Chapter 17), Harold Brodkey’s short story “The Nurse’s Music,” and at the end of the late 14th-century Middle English Arthurian romance, Sir Gawain and the Green Knight.
 It appears in the stage directions of Giuseppe Verdi's Falstaff, libretto by Arrigo Boito, in Act 3, scene 1, where it is written above the door at the Garter Inn.
 It appears in the comments of the Apollo Guidance Computer assembly source code for the master ignition routine of the Lunar Module.
 It is sung in full as the chorus of John Cale's song "Honi Soit (La Première Leçon de Français)" featured on the 1981 album Honi Soit.
 It appears in the staff used by the Usher of the Black Rod of the Parliament of Canada. It also figures on the cap badge of the Royal Montreal Regiment. 
 It is incorporated in the coat of arms of the Basilica of Saint Paul Outside the Walls in Rome
 It is used as the motto of The Blue Book, a guide to prostitutes in Storyville, New Orleans published 1895-1915.
 It appears as a comment in the source code for the Apollo 11 Lunar Module's master ignition routine.
 It appears on the entry gates to pop star Michael Jackson's Neverland estate.
 It is a motto of the Fort Henry Guard, of Kingston, Ontario, and appears on the Shako worn by the guard.

In popular culture
In the last episode of Series 3 of BBC political comedy The Thick of It, it is suggested that one of spin-doctor Malcolm Tucker's mottoes is "Honi soit qui Malky fuck".

In the 2018 episode of Doctor Who, "The Witchfinders", the Doctor notes that it is the motto on the garter of King James.

In the M*A*S*H episode "In Love and War", Pierce, during a conversation with Korean national Kyung Soon, mistakenly attributes that quote to François de La Rochefoucauld.

In series 1 episode 1 of Brush Strokes, Jacko uses the phrase when talking to Lionel in his office.

In the film Richard III (1955), the phrase can be seen written on a ribbon attached to Richard's greaves.

See also
 Dieu et mon droit, the motto of the monarch of the United Kingdom for use outside Scotland
 In My Defens God Me Defend, the motto of the monarch of the United Kingdom for use in Scotland
 Nemo me impune lacessit, the motto of the Order of the Thistle
 Ich dien, the motto on the Prince of Wales's feathers
 Quis separabit?, the motto of the Order of St Patrick

References 

Military history of the United Kingdom
British Army
Military mottos
Mottoes of orders of chivalry
Order of the Garter
French words and phrases
Edward III of England